Dolní Měcholupy is a municipal district (městská část) and cadastral area (katastrální území) in Prague. It is located in the eastern part of the city. As of 2008, there were 1,788 inhabitants living in Dolní Měcholupy.

The first written record of Dolní Měcholupy is from the 14th century. The village became part of Prague in 1968.

External links 
 Praha-Dolní Měcholupy - Official homepage

Districts of Prague